Oudomxay (alternates: Oudômxai or Moung Xai) is a province of Laos, located in the northwest of the country. Its capital is Muang Xai.

It borders China to the north, Phongsali province to the northeast, Luang Prabang province to the east and southeast, Xaignabouli province to the south and southwest, Bokeo province to the west, and Luang Namtha province to the northwest.

Oudomxay has deposits of salt, bronze, zinc, antimony, brown coal, kaolin and iron. Attempts to control heroin-related poppy cultivation there have been made through the Narcotics Crop Control Project, begun in the 1990s. Besides rice, important local crops are corn, soybeans, fruits, vegetables, cassava (maniok), sugarcane, tobacco, cotton wool, tea and peanuts. In 2004, approximately 10,000 tons of sugarcane and 45,000 tons of corn were produced there.

History
According to local history books, the first people who settled in Oudomxay around the year 700 were "Khom" (also known as Khmu). About 1260, Lao Ly came from the region of Sipsongpanna in southern China and built a village called Ban Luang Cheng ("big village" or "big district") in the area of today's province capital Muang Xay. The former Lao Ly village is now part of Muang Xaya and is called Bang Cheng.

Ly culture, which was marked by Buddhism on the one hand and the old Khom traditions on the other hand, grew and became very influential on the region. Khom and Leu lived together and shared the same rice fields. To provide protection they erected fortifications between the villages of Na Sao and Na Lai. Around 1828, Hmong tribes coming from China began to settle in Oudomxay. The modern province was created in 1976, when it was split off from Luang Prabang. Around 1987 the capital of the province was moved from Ban Nahin to Muang Xay. In 1992, the districts Paktha and Pha Oudom were reassigned to Bokeo province.

Geography 
The province borders China to the north, Phongsali province to the northeast, Luang Prabang province to the east and southeast, Xaignabouli province to the south and southwest, Bokeo province to the west, and Luang Namtha province to the northwest. In the northwest there is a  border with the autonomous area of Xishuangbanna of the People's Republic of China.
Notable settlements include Muang Xay, Muang La, Pak Beng, Sen Say, Taxoum, Seneke, Sala Mok, Ban Na He, Ban Chomka, Ban Lao Phe, Ban Na Houang, Ban Lo Sa, Ban Lao Than, Ban Donkon, Ban Senlouang, Ban Napa, Ban Phoukeu, Ban Yamai, Ban Haiteu, Ban Kavang, Ban Kheun, Muang Houn, Ban Na Mao, Ban Tong, Ban Khmou, Ban Khokka, and Ban Tong.

The topography of Oudomxay is very mountainous. Approximately 60 rivers flow through Oudomxay province, as for example Nam Phak, Nam Sae, Nam Beng, Nam Kor and Nam Nga. The Nam Kor flows through the province capital Muang Xay. Oudomxay province has a moderate monsoon climate. Temperatures in February and March average between 18 and 19 °C, from April to May temperatures climb over 31 °C. Due to high altitudes there are more variations in temperature during the year and a colder dry season in northern Laos as in the rest of the country.

Protected areas
The Upper Lao Mekong Important Bird Area (IBA) is 10,980 hectare in size. It spans the provinces of Oudomxai, Bokeo, and Sainyabuli. Noted topography includes river channel, exposed beds, sandbars, sand and gravel bars, islands, rock outcrops, bushland, and braided streams. Black-bellied Tern Sterna acuticauda, Great Cormorant Phalacrocorax carbo, Grey-headed Lapwing V. cinereus, Jerdon's Bushchat Saxicola jerdoni, Plain Martin Riparia paludicola, River Lapwing Vanellus duvaucelii, Small Pratincole Glareola lactea, and Swan Goose Anser cygnoides are some of the recorded avifauna.

Vegetation in Oudomxay is rich by virtue of the monsoon climate. Several kinds of bamboo and a broad range of plants (for example orchids) are found in the region. Also hardwoods like teak and mahogany trees grow in Oudomxay and are important sources of income for the population.

Administrative divisions
The province is made up of the following districts:

Demographics 
The population of the province according to the 2015 census is 307,622.

The exact proportions of the approximately 14 different ethnic groups living in Oudomxay are still not precisely known. According to the province administration, the following estimations can be assumed; Khmu (among them Khmu Lu, Khmu Khong, Khmu Am, Khmu Bit) 60–80%, Lao Loum 25%, Hmong (among them Hmong Khao, Hmong Dam und Hmong lai) 15%. Minor ethnic groups living in the province include Akha, Phouthai (Thai Dam & Thai Khao), Phou Noy (Phou Xang, Phou Kongsat, Phou Nhot), Lao Houy (also „Lenten“), Phouan, Ly, Yang, Ikho and Ho.

Economy
Oudomxay has deposits of salt, bronze, zinc, antimony, brown coal, kaolin and iron deposits.  Attempts to control poppy cultivation in the province have been made through the Narcotics Crop Control Project, formulated in the 1990s. The extremely limited accessibility of the mountain villages additionally impedes economic development of rural regions. Approximately 40,000 hectares of land are cultivated in Oudomxay, with rice being the main crop.

Subsistence agriculture
In Oudomxay province, most of the population still practices subsistence agriculture. Predominantly "slash-and-burn"-agriculture is used, often linked with growing mountain rice – 45% of rural villages in Oudomxay depend on swidden agriculture, due to the province's mountainous topography. This form of agriculture is very labour-intensive and takes up huge areas of land, as soils need a long time until their original productivity is recovered. Cropping rice using the wet-field paddy system is just possible in plain lowlands, which in Oudomxay are scarce. Both mountain rice grown at the mountain sides, as well as most of the few cultivable areas in the lowlands are merely irrigated by natural rainfalls. Very few rice fields in the lowlands have artificial irrigation systems. Besides rice, other important crops are corn, soybeans, fruits, vegetables, cassava (maniok), sugarcane, tobacco, cotton wool, tea and peanuts. In 2004, approximately 10,000 tons of sugarcane and 45,000 tons of corn were produced. Corn, onions, watermelons and tobacco are exported. In cooperation with international organisations, the government is working to increase production intensity proposing a sustainable usage of natural resources. Besides the use of land for agricultural purposes, approximately 40,000 hectares of land are forested or used as meadows. Livestock breeding, above all of water buffalos, pigs, cattle and chickens, is an important component for the livelihood of rural population. According to estimations of the IUCN, approximately 12% of Oudomxay forests are primary forests, 48% secondary forests. For the population, the forests are not only source of wood, but also contribute to family incomes providing fruits, herbs and meat. It is also common that Lao cultivable land is rented to Chinese, which then is tilled by Chinese migratory labourers.

Tourism
Since some years, efforts are taken to support tourism in Oudomxay, which is considered a chance to minimize poverty of the population. A tourism office has operated in Muang Xay since 1997,  supported by German Development Service (DED) since 2005. The support of DED aims to raise the incomes especially of the rural population and small-scale enterprises by tourism and thereby protect natural resources.  In August 2007 the tourism office was upgraded to a “Provincial Tourism Department”. Due to Oudomxay's location as the most important traffic junction in northern Laos (the only road from Luang Prabang up north crosses Oudomxay), in the past few years the province was mainly visited by foreigners on the journey through. The average length of stay was low. 
According to the „Statistical Report on Tourism in Laos 2008“ by the „Lao National Tourism Administration“, the number of tourists has increased from approximately 18,600 to 102,000 from 2001 to 2008. According to the statistic, approximately 17% of all 1.7 million tourists visiting Laos in 2008 came to Oudomxay as well. Oudomxay disposes of eight hotels and approximately 52 guesthouses., most of them located in the province capital Muang Xay and the riverine traffic junction Pak Beng. Bad infrastructural conditions impede an optimal exhaustion of touristic potential in Oudomxay province. Trekking tours to villages of ethnic minorities are not impacted by infrastructural limitations.

Landmarks
There are many landmarks in the province and some of the prominent ones are the following.

Muang La is an important Buddhist pilgrimage for Theravada Buddhists in the province. Saymoungkhoune Rattana Stupa located here has a highly revered Buddha image, which is 400 years old and is reported to have supernatural powers.

Chom Ong Cave, the longest cave in Laos, is located in Ban Chom Ong, 45 km to the northwest of Oudomxay town and is the biggest known cave in northern Laos. The cave was explored by a team of cave researchers during 2009, 2010 and 2011 and reported to be 18.4 km long and considered as the second longest in Laos and 9th longest in South East Asia. The average dimensions of the cave is 20–25 m in width and 20–30 m in height. It has two passages, one is a stream and the other has fossils and both connect to a large hall which is 100 m long, 30 m wide and of varying height of 30–50 m up to the roof. It has a stream inlet in the north and the stream outflows in the southern end.

During the Indochina war, people of the village, who had till then kept the location of the cave a secret, had to use the cave as bomb shelter, and they thought that their prayers to Buddha had helped to protect them from the bombings. Hence, they named the cave as “Phachao Khamtan” or “Khamtan Buddha” Cave where 'Phachao' means "Buddha" and 'Khamtan' means "Valuable Protective Shield".

Culture
The Baci festival was started even before Buddhism made inroads into Laos, as an animist ritual used to celebrate important events and occasions, like births and marriages and also entering the monkhood, departing, returning, beginning a new year, and welcoming or bidding etc. It is particularly special for ethnic groups of the mountainous region of northern Laos such as Oudomxay province, though it is now celebrated throughout Laos as a national festival and also in neighbouring Thailand. It a traditional cult festival in which after offering prayers to Buddha, in a formal gathering people tie a white thread (symbolically representing purity) or string on the wrist of their opposites wishing for their well-being, ward off ill luck and bring them good luck. The ceremony is held as a part of marriage festival or any auspicious occasion in the family when family members get together. The thread can be taken off only  three days after its tying.

This practice is linked to the ancient belief that Baci is invoked religiously to synchronise the effects of 32 organs of human body considered as kwan (KWA-ang) or  spirits or the “components of the soul.” Its observance to establish as social and family bond to maintain “balance and harmony to the individual and community, is done in its original format in Laos, as a substantiation of human existence.”

References

Bibliography

External links 
Website of the Provincial Tourism Department
Video of Oudomxay

 
Provinces of Laos